Nohair Mohsen Al-Shammari (born 12 July 1976) is a Kuwaiti former footballer who played as a central defender. He won 109 caps for the Kuwait national side in a career which lasted from 1996 to 2009. He played club football for Al-Sulaibikhat Al-Arabi on loan in 1998–1999, Qadsia and Al-Salmiya.

See also
 List of men's footballers with 100 or more international caps

References

1976 births
Living people
Kuwaiti footballers
Al-Sulaibikhat SC players
Al-Arabi SC (Kuwait) players
Qadsia SC players
Al Salmiya SC players
Association football defenders
Kuwait international footballers
FIFA Century Club
2000 AFC Asian Cup players
2004 AFC Asian Cup players
Asian Games medalists in football
Footballers at the 1998 Asian Games
Footballers at the 2002 Asian Games
Asian Games silver medalists for Kuwait
Medalists at the 1998 Asian Games
Kuwait Premier League players